Gustave Franciscus De Smet (21 January 1877 – 8 October 1943) was a Belgian painter. Together with Constant Permeke and Frits Van den Berghe, he was one of the founders of Flemish Expressionism. His younger brother, also became a painter.

Biography
He was born in Ghent. His father, Jules, was a set decorator and photographer. Both Gustave and his brother began working in their father's studio, then attended the Royal Academy of Fine Arts, where they studied under Jean Delvin. Unlike Léon, Gustave was considered to be an indifferent student.

In 1908, he and his wife followed Léon to the artists' colony in Sint-Martens-Latem. There, they initially came under the influence of Luminism and the painter Emile Claus, who lived in nearby Astene. At the beginning of World War I, he and his family joined his friend, Van den Berghe, and fled to the Netherlands. From 1914 to 1922, they moved about, visiting and staying at the art colonies in Amsterdam, Laren and Blaricum. His meeting with the Expressionist painter Henri Le Fauconnier marked a turning point in his style which, up until then, owed much to Cubism.

He returned to Belgium in 1922, but continued to move frequently, usually in the company of his friends Van den Berghe and Permeke, beginning in Ostend, then to Bachte-Maria-Leerne and Afsnee, where he lived in a villa provided by the art promoter and journalist, Paul-Gustave van Hecke. In 1927, he finally settled in Deurle.

It was there that his mixture of Expressionism and Cubism peaked, with a series of works depicting circus, fairground and village scenes. After his death in Deurle at the age of sixty-six, his house was preserved as a local museum.

Selected paintings

Public collections
Among the public collections holding works by Gustave De Smet are:

 Antwerp, Royal Museum of Fine Arts Antwerp
 Brussels, Royal Museums of Fine Arts of Belgium
 The Hague, Kunstmuseum Den Haag
 Deinze, Museum van Deinze en de Leiestreek
 Haarlem, Frans Hals Museum
 Ghent, Museum of Fine Arts
 Ostend, Mu.ZEE
 Venlo, Museum van Bommel van Dam
 Zwolle, Museum De Fundatie

References

Further reading
Piet Boyens, Gust. De Smet. Kroniek – Kunsthistorische analyse, Fonds Mercator, 1989

External links

 ArtNet: More works by De Smet.
 Municipal Museum Gustave de Smet, Sint Martens-Latem

Belgian Expressionist painters
1877 births
1943 deaths
20th-century Belgian painters
Cubist artists
Artists from Ghent